Anderson Lake may refer to:
Anderson Lake (Cross County, Arkansas)
Anderson Lake (Lee County, Arkansas)
Anderson Lake (California)
Anderson Lake (British Columbia)
Anderson Lake (Vancouver Island)
Anderson Lake (Georgia)
Anderson Lake (Illinois)
Anderson Goose Lake in Iowa, also known as "Anderson Lake"
Anderson Lakes (Minnesota)
Anderson Lake (Nova Scotia)
Anderson Lake (Ontario)
Anderson Lake (South Dakota)
Anderson Lake (Jefferson County, Washington)